"50ft Queenie" is the third single by the English singer-songwriter PJ Harvey, and the first from her second studio album Rid of Me. It is performed by Harvey's trio, consisting of Harvey on vocals and guitar, Rob Ellis on drums and Steve Vaughan on bass. Released in April 1993, the song charted in the United Kingdom and was a Top 30 hit, but failed to chart in the United States. A promotional music video directed by Maria Mochnacz was also filmed.

Background and history
The song was recorded at Pachyderm Studios with Steve Albini, who had previously produced albums for Pixies and The Breeders. Harvey praised Albini's work because she thought "the instruments on the album sound like they're breathing and real".

Track listing
All songs written by PJ Harvey.

UK CD and European 12" single (Island Records, CID 538, 862 037–2 / 12IS 538, 862 037–1)
 50 ft Queenie – 2:26
 Reeling – 2:39
 Man-Size (demo) – 3:24
 Hook (demo) – 4:33

Tracks 1 and 2 recorded by Steve Albini. Tracks 3 and 4 recorded by PJ Harvey.

The demo version of "Hook" later appeared on 4-Track Demos.

UK 7" single (Island Records, IS 538, 862 037–7)
 50 ft Queenie – 2:26
 Reeling – 2:39
 Man-Size (demo) – 3:24

Music video
Directed by Maria Mochnacz, the music video for the song shows PJ Harvey performing the song, with the small leopard skin coat as seen in the single's inlay artwork. The backdrop of the video reads "HEY I'M ONE BIG QUEEN". It was later used on Beavis and Butt-Head.

Chart positions

References

1993 singles
PJ Harvey songs
Song recordings produced by Steve Albini
Songs written by PJ Harvey
1993 songs
Island Records singles